The open–closed political spectrum, an alternative to the standard left–right political spectrum, used to describe the cleavage in political systems in Europe and North America in the 21st century. In this system, parties and voters are arranged on a single axis from open (socially liberal and globalist) to closed (culturally conservative and protectionist). Each side draws from both traditionally left- and right-wing ideas and values. For example, "closed" parties usually hold conventionally right-wing views on social issues but may support the left-wing policies of market intervention and redistribution of wealth. Open parties can hold left-wing or progressive opinions on many issues but be staunchly in favour of the traditionally more rightist policies of free trade. Depending on context, open–closed can be a replacement to left–right or a second axis on a political compass.

A political realignment along these lines across the Western world has been described by political scientists in the wake of the financial crisis of 2007–2008, the Great Recession and the European migrant crisis, with mainstream left-wing and right-wing political parties shifting or falling behind populist parties and independents. Examples of votes described as having been fought on open-closed lines include the 2016 Brexit referendum, presidential elections in Austria in 2016, the United States in 2016 and France in 2017, and general elections in Poland in 2015 and the Netherlands in 2017.

Precursors and terminology 
Prior to the development of socialism in the late 19th and early 20th centuries, the primary divide in British politics was between classical liberalism (Whiggism) and traditional conservatism (Toryism) as seen in debates about free trade and the Corn Laws, and James Kirkup, writing in the Daily Telegraph, has suggested that the open-closed split marks a return to this era of politics. In the United States, the rise of the socially-liberal New Left and socially-conservative religious right in the 1970s, and the subsequent "culture wars", marked the beginning of the open-closed cleavage. Fareed Zakaria, writing in the Washington Post, described the Nordic model of free market social democracy as another early example of open politics.

Stephan Shakespeare, director of public opinion research at YouGov, identified the divide in an analysis of the party positions in the 2005 UK general election, but termed closed and open voters "drawbridge up" and "drawbridge down" respectively. The terms "open" and "closed" for this divide were first used by then-British prime minister Tony Blair in 2006, with reference to the horseshoe theory that far-left and far-right politics are similar in substance. Blair, who declared himself staunchly for "open", had overseen the development of the Third Way New Labour movement in 1990s and the schism in the Labour Party between "open" Blairites and "closed" traditional socialists has remained. Political analyst James Bloodworth criticised Blair's choice of terminology, describing "closed" as pejorative to those threatened by globalism and "open" as overly laudatory of the "Davos Man" type of globalist.

Rise and development 

Following the financial crisis and subsequent recession, plus the arrival of large numbers of refugees of the Syrian Civil War, populist political parties made significant gains across the European Union. In southern European countries, these tended to be anti-austerity left-wing parties such as Syriza in Greece and Podemos in Spain, while northern European countries saw anti-immigrant right-wing parties such as the UK Independence Party and the Alternative for Germany gain support. However all these parties shared a Eurosceptic and anti-elite viewpoint, and appealed to the "left-behind" who saw their livelihoods or communities as threatened by globalism and immigration. In 2015, Syriza became the largest party in the Parliament of Greece, while the right-wing populist Law and Justice became the first party since the fall of Communism to win an absolute majority in the Polish Sejm in elections the same year. At the 2016 United Kingdom European Union membership referendum, the Leave option narrowly defeated the cross-party Remain option. The subsequent realignment of British politics saw the Conservatives, aligned with "Leave", and Liberal Democrats, aligned with "Remain", rise in the polls while Labour, which remained deeply divided between its open and closed wings, lost ground rapidly.

Similar political developments followed in the United States in the run-up to the 2016 presidential election. Democratic nominee Hillary Clinton, liberal and pro-globalism, faced two political opponents who both represented protectionist viewpoints from opposite ends of the left–right spectrum: Bernie Sanders, a democratic socialist who challenged her in the primaries, and the Republican nominee Donald Trump, running on a nativist "America First" platform. Trump eventually triumphed, winning several Rust Belt states from the "Blue Wall" of Democratic safe states which had suffered deindustrialisation and economic deprivation.

While "closed" politicians scored several electoral victories, another realignment in the political centre began in Europe, as cosmopolitan pro-European voters abandoned traditional parties of government and clustered around new liberal parties and independent politicians. In the Netherlands, where the closed anti-Islam and anti-European Party for Freedom (PVV) under Geert Wilders led opinion polls for much of the previous parliament, the liberal pro-EU Democrats 66 and the green GroenLinks positioned themselves as the main open opponents of the PVV. At the 2017 elections, all three parties made significant gains at the expense of the established parties.

Alexander Van der Bellen, an independent formerly of The Greens, defeated the anti-immigrant Norbert Hofer of the Freedom Party of Austria in the 2016 Austrian presidential election, while Emmanuel Macron, a former member of the Socialists who described himself as "neither left nor right" and who founded his own party En Marche, defeated the Front National candidate Marine Le Pen in the 2017 French presidential election. In both cases, neither of the mainstream parties of left and right reached the second round of voting – instead, each election saw an open centrist independent against a closed far-right party.

Open and closed policies 
Although they can come from all sides of the left–right spectrum, closed parties share common ground on many issues, as likewise do open parties.

Immigration and social integration 
Opposition to immigration is one of the starkest divides between open and closed parties. The closed position supports restrictions on migration, and prefers that immigrants integrate into the national culture. By contrast, the open position takes a more liberal stance on migration, and tolerates or even celebrates multiculturalism. Both left-wing and right-wing parties can be closed on the topic of immigration: the conservative Polish Law and Justice accuses immigrants of undermining Polish values and bringing in terrorists, while the socialist German Left Party considers immigrants a drain on the welfare state. Conversely, in the United Kingdom for example the Adam Smith Institute (a neoliberal right-wing organisation) and Vince Cable (a centre-left social democrat and former business secretary) stand together as some of the strongest defenders of immigration.

Trade and economic integration 

Issues of international trade and international cooperation are another significant line of division between the two camps. In the open ideology, free trade and globalism is a net good, strengthening the national economy and providing jobs while cutting prices. In the closed ideology, free trade is detrimental to the national economy and encourages companies to offshore industries, resulting in lower wages and higher unemployment, as well as potentially threatening national culture. The closed attitude to globalism manifests in opposition to trade agreements such as the Transatlantic Trade and Investment Partnership, to military alliances such as NATO, and to supranational unions such as the EU, which are generally supported by the open side.

Elites and anti-establishmentism 
Pro-closed politicians opposing free trade and immigration usually describe these as impositions from an existing political elite, either within the country or outside its borders, and campaign on an anti-establishment platform. In the most extreme case, this can cross over into conspiracism, alleging that shadowy figures are actively trying to harm the nation.

Identity 
Identity politics plays a role in forming both the open and closed coalitions. Pro-closed voters tend to have a strong sense of national identity, while pro-open ones share a more cosmopolitan identity. This does not mean that all closed voters are racist, nor that all open voters are unpatriotic. Nationalist pride can be enhanced by the arrival of newcomers, if these assimilate to the national culture quickly. Conversely some open politicians, such as Jesse Klaver, leader of GroenLinks, and Emmanuel Macron, have succeeded in developing a patriotic alternative to nationalism in which tolerance and cooperation are themselves considered national values to be prized and protected.

Demographics of cleavage 
Political scientists have identified several lines of cleavage between supporters of open and closed parties. Educational attainment was the strongest predictor of voting preference in the Brexit referendum and the 2016/2017 US, Dutch and French elections: in each case, those with low educational achievement were more likely to vote for the closed or populist option. This was described by the BBC as "one of the most remarkable features of the US election", as the Republican party usually performs well among university graduates.

Income has been suggested as another dividing line: in the EU referendum, the bottom fifth of UK earners overwhelmingly voted for Brexit (68% Leave, 32% Remain) while a large majority of the top quarter voted against Brexit (39% Leave, 61% Remain). However, Trump performed better with middle class voters than with either the highest or lowest earners and, although a small wealth effect was seen among French voters, this disappeared when controlling for education.

Pessimism and optimism also appear to be important psychological factors in determining whether a voter chooses an open or a closed candidate. Le Pen only took 20% of the vote of those who believed the situation would improve for the next generation, but over 40% among those who believed it would deteriorate. A majority of Leave voters agreed life in Britain is worse than it was thirty years ago, while a majority of Remain voters disagreed.

See also 
 Identity politics
 Liberal democracy and illiberal democracy
 Open society

References

Further reading 
 

Political spectrum
Dichotomies
Political science terminology